Formigoni is a surname. Notable people with the surname include:

Bruno Formigoni (born 1990), Brazilian footballer
Roberto Formigoni (born 1947), Italian politician